Treasure City (originally Tesora) is an abandoned mining town located in the Treasure Hill region of the White Pine Range, in western White Pine County, Nevada, United States.

History

Treasure City began as an encampment after the discovery of silver in the  Treasure Hill area in 1867. It was incorporated on March 5, 1869, in what was then Lander County.

The post office was first opened as Tesora in April 1869, and was renamed Treasure City in June 1869.

The Treasure Hill mineral deposits were soon discovered to be much more limited than originally believed, and within only a few years the area, including Treasure City, went into decline.  By 1870, the population of Treasure City, which at its peak was estimated to be as high as 7,000, was only 500. The town was disincorporated by the state legislature in 1879, its post office closed in December 1880, and by the early 1880s was deserted.

External links
 Forgotten Nevada: Treasure City
 Online Nevada Encyclopedia: Hamilton and Treasure Hill

References

Ghost towns in White Pine County, Nevada
Populated places established in 1869
Ghost towns in Nevada
1869 establishments in Nevada